The Jurca MJ-10 Spitfire is a sport aircraft designed by Marcel Jurca in France as a replica of the Supermarine Spitfire and marketed for homebuilding. Plans for two versions were produced, the MJ-10, at 3/4 scale, and the MJ-100, at full-scale. Construction throughout is of wood, and the builder may choose to complete the aircraft with either a single seat or two seats in tandem. The version represented is the Mk.IX Spitfire, but allowances are made to allow the builder to portray other versions, in particular the Mk.Vc and the Mk.XIV. Additionally, the MJ-100 version may be built with a fuselage structure of welded steel tube if desired. Plans for both versions were marketed by Falconar and later Jurca Plans West.

As of July 2017 two MJ-100s are known to have flown, one each in France (the prototype, F-WGML, originally with a Hispano-Suiza but later refitted with an Allison V-1710) and the USA (with a V-1710), with several others under construction around the world.

Variants
 MJ-10 - 3/4 scale version
 MJ-100 - full-scale version

Specifications (MJ-10)

See also

References

External links
 Marcel Jurca website

1980s French sport aircraft
Homebuilt aircraft
Supermarine Spitfire replicas
Jurca aircraft
Single-engined tractor aircraft
Low-wing aircraft
Aircraft first flown in 1982